Paths of War is a 1970 Italian western-comedy film directed by Aldo Grimaldi starring the comic duo Franco and Ciccio.

Plot summary 
In 1858 in Italy, in Sicily, Franco and Ciccio defend the Bourbon army to prevent the unification of Italy built by Giuseppe Garibaldi. However, when the troops of Garibaldi defeated the Bourbons, Franco and Ciccio escape, taking refuge in a box, which is delivered in America. In the Far West, Franco and Ciccio find themselves involved in the American War of Independence against the Apache Indians. They, camouflage, disguise themselves first by warlike Americans, and then by Indian holy men, being able to save their skin.

Cast 

 Franco Franchi: Franco
 Ciccio Ingrassia: Ciccio
 Stelvio Rosi: Martin
 Renato Baldini: Jeff
 Adler Gray: Lucy Foster
 Joseph P. Persaud: Indian Chief 
 Alfredo Rizzo: Sgt. Douglas
 Lino Banfi: Mormon 
 Luigi Bonos: Bartender

References

External links

1970 films
Films set in 1858
Italian Western (genre) comedy films
Spaghetti Western films
Films directed by Aldo Grimaldi
Italian buddy comedy films
1970s buddy comedy films
American Revolutionary War films
1970s Western (genre) comedy films
Films with screenplays by Giovanni Grimaldi
Films with screenplays by Aldo Grimaldi
1970 comedy films
Films scored by Roberto Pregadio
1970s Italian films